United Kingdom Nuclear Decommissioning Authority (NDA) term for Nuclear Site management licensees, known as Tier 1 contractors, who receive funding from the NDA.

References

Nuclear energy in the United Kingdom